The Mercury Theatre is a theatre in Colchester, producing highly regarded original work under the title "Mercury Productions" and also receiving touring shows. The theatre has two auditoria, and is led by Tracey Childs (Executive Producer and Joint Chief Executive), Steve Mannix (Executive Director and Joint Chief Executive) and Ryan McBryde (Creative Director). The theatre also contains The Digby Gallery, which showcases local art.

History
In 1968, the Colchester New Theatre Trust was formed to identify a site for a new theatre and to oversee its constructions. The Mercury Theatre, designed by Norman Downie, was opened on 10 May 1972, after a successful fund-raising campaign, supported by a large grant from the Borough Council. It originated with the Colchester Repertory Company, formed in 1937.

The theatre was initially structurally identical to the Salisbury Playhouse, though the Playhouse was later extended.

David Buxton, the first Artistic Director, was succeeded by Michael Winter in 1984. After David Forder's retirement as Administrative Director in late 1990, Michael became Artistic Director and Chief Executive. In May 1994, Pat Trueman succeeded him in the joint role, until 1998. Adrian Stokes joined as Associate Director in 1995 and initiated the Community Education Programme.

In 1998 Dee Evans arrived as Chief Executive and Gregory Floy as Artistic Producer. Together, in 1999, they formed the Mercury Theatre Company with Gregory as Artistic Director. In 2012 the Company was superseded by Made in Colchester, introduced by newly appointed Artistic Director Daniel Buckroyd and Executive Director Theresa Veith. In 2019 a revamped leadership structure was announced with Tracey Childs (Executive Producer) and Steve Mannix (Executive Director) appointed as Joint Chief Executives and Ryan McBryde appointed as Creative Director.

Featured artists 
Productions at the Mercury have included the work of John Cleese, Martin Clunes, Gwen Taylor, Simon Gray, Toby Longworth, Ingrid Lacey, Michael Grandage, Mike Poulton, Michael Deacon, Colin McCormack, David Oakes, Donald Freed

Michael Grandage made his directorial debut at the Mercury with "The Last Yankee", and Trevor Howard began his career at the Colchester Repertory Company.

Gari Jones, formerly of the National Theatre, has regularly piloted new work at the Mercury Theatre.

2018 Made in Colchester productions
 Jack and the Beanstalk
 Silence by Nicola Werenowska (co-production with Wiltshire Creative and Unity Theatre, Liverpool)
 Moll Flanders by Nick Perry (An unfaithful adaptation based on the novel by Daniel Defoe)
 Babe, The Sheep-Pig by David Wood, based on the book by Dick King-Smith
 Europe After the Rain by Oliver Bennett
 Pieces of String by Gus Gowland (co-production with TBO Productions)
 Turn of the Screw by Henry James adapted by Tim Luscombe (co-production with Dermot McLaughlin Productions and Wolverhampton Grand Theatre)

2017 Made in Colchester productions
 Snow White and the Seven Dwarfs
 The Weir (co-production with English Touring Theatre) by Conor McPherson
 Peter Pan
 Farm Boy by Michael Morpurgo
 The Events by David Greig
 Spamalot
 Bang Bang (co-production with John Cleese) based on Georges Feydeau's

2016 Made in Colchester productions
 Dick Whittington
 Sweeney Todd: The Demon Barber of Fleet Street (co-production with Derby Theatre)
 Much Ado About Nothing by William Shakespeare
 Wind in the Willows by Kenneth Grahame
 Private Lives by Noël Coward
 End of the Rainbow (co-production with Paul Taylor-Mills) starring Lisa Maxwell as Judy Garland

2015 Made in Colchester productions
 Aladdin
 Bully Boy by Sandi Toksvig
 James and the Giant Peach
 Little Shop of Horrors
 Noises Off
 Animal Farm
 The Smallest Show on Earth (Co-Production with Brian Eastman and Christabel Albery)
 Educating Rita by Willy Russell

2014 Made in Colchester productions
 Dial M for Murder by Frederick Knott
 Betty Blue Eyes by Alan Bennett, Malcolm Mowbray, Daniel Lipman and Ron Cowen
 Saturday Night and Sunday Morning by Alan Sillitoe
 You Can Always Hand Them Back by Roger Hall and Peter Skellern
 The Wall by Roger Waters
 Friend or Foe by Michael Morpurgo
 Macbeth by William Shakespeare
 Dracula by Fitzrovia Radio Hour

2013 Made in Colchester productions
 Garage Band by Andy Barrett
 The Hired Man by Melvyn Bragg and Howard Goodall
 Intimate Exchanges by Alan Ayckbourn
 The History Boys by Alan Bennett
 Quadrophenia by Kenneth Emson
 The Butterfly Lion by Michael Morpurgo
 The Good Person of Sichuan by Bertolt Brecht
 Man to Man by Manfred Karge
 The Opinion Makers by Brian Mitchell and Joseph Nixon
 Sleeping Beauty by Jonathan Petherbridge

References

External links 
Mercury Theatre home page
Financial Times review of The Butterfly Lion September 2013
Guardian review of The Hired Man, March 2013
Guardian review of Devil's Advocate, November 2005
Telegraph review of Journey's End, April 2008

Theatres in Essex
1972 establishments in England
Buildings and structures completed in 1972
Buildings and structures in Colchester (town)